Todd Woodbridge and Mark Woodforde were the defending champions, but lost in the quarterfinals to tournament runners-up Justin Gimelstob and Patrick Rafter.

Martin Damm and Daniel Vacek won the title by defeating Gimelstob and Rafter 2–6, 6–2, 7–6 in the final.

Seeds
The first four seeds received a bye to the second round.

Draw

Finals

Top half

Bottom half

References

External links
 Official results archive (ATP)
 Official results archive (ITF)

1997 Japan Open Tennis Championships